Greg R. Zolman is a former American football quarterback. He was a member of several NFL teams over a three-year period and played a year in NFL Europe. He played college football at Vanderbilt.

College career
Zolman became the starter for Vanderbilt about halfway through his freshman year in 1998 and was the starting quarterback the final three seasons. By the time Zolman left Vanderbilt he held every meaningful passing record in school history including the school's all-time leading passer with 7,981 yards until surpassed by  Jay Cutler.

Professional career
Zolman played on five different NFL teams: Buffalo, Green Bay, Indianapolis, St. Louis and Tampa. He played one season in NFL Europe for the Rhein Fire.

References

Sources
 "Zolman Playing in NFL Europe", Dayton Daily News, May 13, 2004 
 "Zolman Rushes to Catch Up in Quarterback Competition", St. Louis Post-Dispatch, August 1, 2003 
 "Zolman Throws for Career-High 441 Yards", Dayton Daily News, November 13, 2001 
 "Zolman Nears Top of Vandy's Career Passing Mark", Columbus Ledger-Enquirer (GA), September 28, 2001 
 "The Bull's-Eye Is on the Quarterback: Zolman Guides Vandy Offense That Has Thrown Caution to Wind", Birmingham News, September 26, 2001 
 "QB Zolman Figures in Team's Cautious Optimism", Birmingham News, August 2, 2001 
 "Zolamn Leads Commodores, Miamisburg soph sparks resurgence at Vanderbilt", Dayton Daily News, September 26, 1999

Living people
American football quarterbacks
Vanderbilt Commodores football players
Buffalo Bills players
Indianapolis Colts players
St. Louis Rams players
Tampa Bay Buccaneers players
Green Bay Packers players
1978 births